Purnea Junction railway station (station code:- PRNA), is the railway station serving the city of Purnea in the Purnea district in the Indian state of Bihar. It is a A category railway station of Katihar railway division in Northeast Frontier Railway.

History
Purnea Junction was opened on 1887 and the previous name of this station was Purnea City. This is situated on Katihar–Jogbani line of North East Frontier Railway (NFR). This railway line earlier was metre gauge. Another standard-gauge line of East Central Railway (ECR) connects Purnea with  via Banmankhi. Conversion of the 36 km-long Purnea–Banmankhi stretch in Purnea–Saharsa section to broad gauge project is completed in 2016.

Facilities 
Purnea lies in between Katihar–Jogbani section. Purnea has trains running frequently to Delhi and Kolkata. Gauge Conversion of Katihar-Jogbani Section and Purnea-Saharsa Section was completed on 2009 and 2016 respectively.

The major facilities available are waiting rooms, retiring room, computerised reservation facility, reservation counter, vehicle parking etc. The vehicles are allowed to enter the station premises. There are refreshment rooms vegetarian and non-vegetarian, tea stall, book stall, post and telegraphic office and Government Railway police (G.R.P.) office.

There are 3 platforms in Purnea Junction. The platforms are interconnected with only one foot overbridge (FOB) with lifts. On 10 April 2018 free Wi-Fi facility was started.

Trains 
Time Table

Mail/Express 
Janaki Intercity Express
Route- Manihari, Purnea,  and 

 Hate Bazare Express (Via Purnea)
Route: , Purnea,  and 
Kolkata–Jogbani Express

Seemanchal Express

Local/Passenger 
 Katihar–Jogbani DEMU Service
 Purnea–Saharsa DEMU Service

References 

Purnia district
Katihar railway division
Railway junction stations in Bihar